The West Indies women's cricket team played the Pakistan women's cricket team in Pakistan and the United Arab Emirates in January and February 2019. The tour consisted of three Women's One Day Internationals (WODIs) and three Women's Twenty20 Internationals (WT20Is). The WODI games were part of the 2017–20 ICC Women's Championship.

The WT20I matches were played in Karachi, Pakistan. It was the first time in fifteen years since the West Indies women's team visited the country, when they played seven WODI matches in March 2004. The team arrived in Pakistan on 30 January, and were escorted by more than 500 policemen in  bullet-proof buses to their hotel. The West Indies' WT20I captain, Merissa Aguilleira, said "I'm pleased we can bring back cricket to Pakistan". Following the conclusion of the tour, West Indies' bowler Shakera Selman said that it was an "honour" to help Pakistan to play in front of their home crowds and families.

The West Indies Women won the WT20I series 2–1. The second match ended in a tie, with the West Indies Women winning the Super Over. Pakistan's captain Bismah Maroof was injured in a practice session ahead of the WODI series. Javeria Khan captained the side in the first WODI in her absence. Pakistan Women won the WODI series 2–1, their first ever WODI series win against the West Indies Women.

Squads

WT20I series

1st WT20I

2nd WT20I

3rd WT20I

WODI series

1st WODI

2nd WODI

3rd WODI

Notes

References

External links
 Series home at ESPN Cricinfo

2017–20 ICC Women's Championship
Pakistan 2019
2019 in West Indian cricket
2019 in Pakistani cricket
International cricket competitions in 2018–19
Pakistan women's national cricket team
International cricket competitions in the United Arab Emirates
2019 in women's cricket
2019 in Emirati cricket